{{DISPLAYTITLE:Kir2.1}}

The Kir2.1 inward-rectifier potassium channel is a lipid-gated ion channel encoded by the  gene.

Clinical significance 

A defect in this gene is associated with Andersen-Tawil syndrome.

A mutation in the KCNJ2 gene  has also been shown to cause short QT syndrome.

In research 

In neurogenetics, Kir2.1 is used in Drosophila research to inhibit neurons, as overexpression of this channel will hyperpolarize cells.

In optogenetics, a trafficking sequence from Kir2.1 has been added to halorhodopsin to improve its membrane localization. The resulting protein eNpHR3.0 is used in optogenetic research to inhibit neurons with light.

Expression of Kir2.1 gene in human HEK293 cells induce a transient outward current, creating a steady membrane potential close to the reversal potential of potassium.

Interactions 

Kir2.1 has been shown to interact with:
 DLG4, 
 Interleukin 16, and
 TRAK2

References

Further reading

External links 
  GeneReviews/NCBI/NIH/UW entry on Andersen-Tawil syndrome
  OMIM entries on Anderson-Tawil syndrome
 
 

Ion channels